Bedevlia ( or Bedevlya,  or Bedevle) is a village in Zakarpattia Oblast (province) of western Ukraine. , its population was 3,971.

Geography
The village is located around 7 km south of Tiachiv. Administratively, the village belongs to the Tiachiv Raion, Zakarpattia Oblast.

History
Bedevlia was first mentioned in 1336 by the name of Bedeuhaza.

In 1336, Charles I of Hungary donated possession of the land boundary of Bedeuhaza to his royal servants the brothers Drag and Dragoş, the diploma refers to them as "servants of the king".

Bedőháza belonged to Máramaros County until the Treaty of Trianon of 1920.

Population
According to the official census of 2001, the population included 5423 inhabitants.

Gallery

References

External links
 Official website

Villages in Tiachiv Raion